Nuttall railway station (Balochi: نٹال ریلوے اسٹیشن) is located in Nuttall village, Nasirabad district of Balochistan province of Pakistan.

See also
 List of railway stations in Pakistan
 Pakistan Railways

Notes 

Railway stations in Nasirabad District
Railway stations on Rohri–Chaman Railway Line